Sharon Marguerite Gless (born May 31, 1943) is an American actress and author, who is known for her television roles as Maggie Philbin on Switch (1975–78), Sgt. Christine Cagney in the police procedural drama series Cagney & Lacey (1982–88), the title role in The Trials of Rosie O'Neill (1990–92), Debbie Novotny in the Showtime cable television series Queer as Folk (2000–2005), and Madeline Westen on Burn Notice (2007–2013). A 10-time Emmy Award nominee and seven-time Golden Globe Award nominee, she won a Golden Globe in 1986 and Emmys in 1986 and 1987 for Cagney & Lacey, and a second Golden Globe in 1991 for The Trials of Rosie O'Neill. Gless received a star on the Hollywood Walk of Fame in 1995.

Early life and career
A fifth-generation Californian, Gless was born in Los Angeles, the daughter of Marjorie (McCarthy) and sportswear manufacturing executive Dennis J. Gless. She was raised Catholic. She has two brothers, Michael McCarthy Gless and Arick Dennis Gless. Her parents divorced when she was in her teens. Her maternal grandfather was Neil McCarthy, a prominent Los Angeles attorney for Howard Hughes, who also had a large clientele of major film-studio executives and actors. Wanting to become an actress, she sought her grandfather's advice and he told her, "Stay out of it, it's a filthy business!" A few years later, though, when she spoke to him again about acting, he encouraged her, and gave her money for acting classes.

She worked as a secretary for advertising agencies Grey Advertising and Young & Rubicam, and then for the independent movie production companies Sassafras Films and General Film Corporation.

While she worked as a production assistant, Gless studied drama with acting coach Estelle Harman. In 1972, she signed a 7-year contract with Universal Studios, and remained under contract until Universal ended all contracts in 1981. Near the end of her contract, she was identified in the media as the last of the contract players, a salaried, old Hollywood apprentice system, which Universal was the last to employ.

Actress Elizabeth Baur was Gless' first cousin.

Career

Film and television
At the beginning of her career, Gless appeared in numerous television series and TV movies, such as Revenge of the Stepford Wives, Faraday & Company with Dan Dailey and James Naughton in 1973 and 1974, Adam 12 season six, episode 24, Emergency! as a sculptor in 1975, and The Rockford Files.  She played small parts in Marcus Welby, M.D. (1969–1976), until being offered the role of Kathleen Faverty, which she played from 1974 to 1976. This was in addition to a variety of guest-starring roles on television, including the part of the classy young secretary, Maggie Philbin, alongside Eddie Albert and Robert Wagner on the CBS private detective/con artist series Switch (1975–1978). Despite being a newcomer on the show, she got along very well with both Albert and Wagner, both on- and off-screen. When the show was cancelled after the third season, she thanked both Albert and Wagner for giving a jump start to her career and remained close friends with them.

While under contract with Universal, she co-starred in a number of properties, including the 1979 Steven Bochco television sitcom, Turnabout (based on the Thorne Smith 1931 novel about a husband and wife who temporarily switch bodies), which failed to be a ratings blockbuster, and briefly in the sitcom House Calls (in which she replaced Lynn Redgrave, who had left due to a contract dispute).

Beginning with the series' seventh episode/first full season, Gless replaced actress Meg Foster in the role of NYPD police detective Christine Cagney on Cagney & Lacey. (The role had been originated, in the pilot installment, by Loretta Swit. Swit, like Foster, was chosen as Cagney because, though the character of Cagney had been created with Gless herself in mind, she was unavailable for the pilot or the first seven installments of the first season.)  In 1991, she married the series' executive producer, Barney Rosenzweig, who speaks in his book Cagney & Lacey...and Me about wanting Sharon Gless from the beginning and Gless being unavailable due to her contract with Universal.

Rosenzweig created the 1990–1992 CBS drama series The Trials of Rosie O'Neill for Gless, and uncredited, played the only partially seen psychiatrist to whom the attorney Fiona "Rosie" O'Neill confided at the beginning of each episode. Gless, who had garnered six Emmy nominations – including two wins and a Golden Globe win for her role as Cagney – earned two additional Emmy nominations and a second Golden Globe win for this subsequent series.

In 1993 and 1995, Gless and her television partner, Tyne Daly, recreated their title roles in a quartet of critically acclaimed and popular Cagney & Lacey television movies. Gless and Tyne Daly jokingly called these "The Menopause Years".

In 1998, Gless narrated the documentary Ayn Rand: A Sense of Life, which received an Academy Award nomination for Best Documentary Feature.

Between 2000 and 2005, Gless appeared as Hal Sparks' mother, Debbie Novotny, in her biggest and most critically acclaimed role since Cagney & Lacey in the acclaimed Showtime cable television series Queer as Folk.

In 2000, she appeared on an episode of Touched by an Angel entitled "The Perfect Game".

On May 26, 2005, Gless was one of the mourners at Eddie Albert's funeral, along with ex-Switch co-stars Robert Wagner and Charlie Callas.

In 2006, Gless starred in the BBC television series The State Within. The following year, she co-starred in the USA Network cable television series Burn Notice, playing Michael Westen's (Jeffrey Donovan) mother, Madeline Westen. In addition, Gless was a guest star on several episodes of the FX Network cable television series Nip/Tuck as an unstable agent named Colleen Rose, a role that netted her an Emmy Award nomination.

In 2009, Gless starred in her first leading role as a lesbian character in the independent film Hannah Free (Ripe Fruit Films), described as a film about a lifelong love affair between an independent spirit and the woman she calls home. The film is based on a screenplay by the Jeff Award-winning playwright Claudia Allen and directed by Wendy Jo Carlton.

In 2017, Gless was announced as appearing in one episode of the BBC's Casualty, the world's longest-running medical drama, as surgeon Zsa Zsa Harper-Jenkinson. She appears in the 13th episode of the serial's 32nd series. Gless called Zsa Zsa a "wonderful character". Gless was invited to appear in the show by one of the producers, and expressed interest in reprising the role. Gless' appearance marked the first time the show has flown an American to the UK to film a role. She reprised the role on the October 13, 2018 episode.

Gless served on the advisory board of the Los Angeles Student Film Institute.

Theater
Gless's most recent stage appearance was as Jane Juska in A Round-Heeled Woman, Jane Prowse's stage adaptation of Jane Juska's book A Round-Heeled Woman: my Late-life Adventures in Sex and Romance. The first production ran in San Francisco in early 2010. Sharon starred in a new production in Miami, December 2010 - February 2011, directed by Jane Prowse. A production took place in London, transferring in November 2011 from Riverside Studios to the Aldwych Theatre, where the run closed on January 14, 2012.

Gless made her stage debut in Lillian Hellman's Watch on the Rhine at Stage West in Springfield, Massachusetts. Gless has extensive stage experience, including two appearances in London's West End, first in 1993 with Bill Paterson, when she created the role of Annie Wilkes in the stage version of Stephen King's Misery at the Criterion Theatre, and then in 1996, where she appeared opposite Tom Conti in Neil Simon's Chapter Two, at the Gielgud Theatre.

She starred at Chicago playhouse The Victory Gardens Theater in Claudia Allen's Cahoots, as well as several stints, including an evening at Madison Square Garden with the National Company of Eve Ensler's The Vagina Monologues. Gless appeared on The Alan Titchmarsh Show on October 17, 2011.

Publications 
 2021: Apparently There Were Complaints: A Memoir, Simon & Schuster (Autobiography)
 2021 (Audible): Apparently There Were Complaints: A Memoir (Audiobook, read by the Author)

Personal life
In 1991, Gless married Barney Rosenzweig, the producer of Cagney & Lacey.

Filmography

Film

Television

Awards and nominations

References

External links

 
 
 A Round-Heeled Woman
 
 Profile at Museum of Broadcast Communications
 
 

1943 births
American film actresses
American stage actresses
American television actresses
Best Drama Actress Golden Globe (television) winners
Outstanding Performance by a Lead Actress in a Drama Series Primetime Emmy Award winners
Living people
Actresses from Los Angeles
20th-century American actresses
21st-century American actresses